Huie is a surname. Notable people with the surname include:

Albert Huie (1920–2010), Jamaican painter
Alexander Huie (1869–1964), Australian journalist
Janice Riggle Huie (born 1946), American United Methodist bishop
Jessica Huie (born 1980), British businesswoman
Oliver Huie (1897–1951), American football coach
Richard Huie (1795-1867) Scottish physician
Shirley Fenton Huie (1924-2016), Australian writer
William Bradford Huie (1910–1986), American journalist and writer